Component station is a light rail station operated by Santa Clara Valley Transportation Authority.  The station is located in San Jose, California in the center median of 1st Street near Component Drive.  The station's street address is 2540 North First Street.

Component has a split platform.  The northbound platform is located just north of Component Drive, the southbound platform is located just south of Component Drive. This station is served by the Blue and Green lines of the VTA Light Rail system.

References

External links 

Transit Unlimited

Santa Clara Valley Transportation Authority light rail stations
Railway stations in San Jose, California
Railway stations in the United States opened in 1987
1987 establishments in California